Stoney Creek was an electoral district in Ontario, Canada, that was represented in the House of Commons of Canada from 1997 to 2003 and in the legislative Assembly of Ontario from 1999 to 2007. It was located in the Hamilton area of Southern Ontario. This riding was created in 1996 from parts of Hamilton—Wentworth and Lincoln ridings.

It consisted of the City of Stoney Creek, the Township of Glanbrook, and the southeast part of the City of Hamilton, and the Town of Grimsby.

The electoral district was abolished in 2003 when it was redistributed between Hamilton East—Stoney Creek, Hamilton Mountain and Niagara West—Glanbrook ridings.

Members of Parliament

This riding has elected the following Members of Parliament:

Federal election results

Provincial election results

See also 
 List of Canadian federal electoral districts
 Past Canadian electoral districts

External links 
 Website of the Parliament of Canada
 Elections Ontario  1999 results and 2003 results

Former federal electoral districts of Ontario
Grimsby, Ontario
Politics of Hamilton, Ontario